John Mole may refer to:
John Mole (musician) (1949–2006), English bass guitar player
John Mole (poet) (born 1941), British poet
John Henry Mole (1814–86), English painter

See also
John L. Moll (1921–2011), American electrical engineer